This is a partial list of unnumbered minor planets for principal provisional designations assigned during 16–30 November 2003. Since this period yielded a high number of provisional discoveries, it is further split into several standalone pages. , a total of 384 bodies remain unnumbered for this period. Objects for this year are listed on the following pages: A–E · F–G · H–L · M–R · Si · Sii · Siii · Siv · T · Ui · Uii · Uiii · Uiv · V · Wi · Wii and X–Y. Also see previous and next year.

W 

|- id="2003 WE" bgcolor=#FFC2E0
| 7 || 2003 WE || APO || 24.6 || data-sort-value="0.043" | 43 m || single || 11 days || 27 Nov 2003 || 56 || align=left | Disc.: CSS || 
|- id="2003 WG" bgcolor=#FFC2E0
| 0 || 2003 WG || APO || 19.25 || data-sort-value="0.54" | 510 m || multiple || 2003–2022 || 04 Dec 2022 || 187 || align=left | Disc.: LONEOSPotentially hazardous object || 
|- id="2003 WH" bgcolor=#E9E9E9
| 0 || 2003 WH || MBA-M || 17.45 || 1.8 km || multiple || 2003–2021 || 07 Nov 2021 || 67 || align=left | Disc.: CSS || 
|- id="2003 WV" bgcolor=#E9E9E9
| 1 || 2003 WV || MBA-M || 18.6 || data-sort-value="0.80" | 800 m || multiple || 2003–2021 || 14 Jan 2021 || 95 || align=left | Disc.: CSS || 
|- id="2003 WN2" bgcolor=#d6d6d6
| 1 ||  || MBA-O || 16.9 || 2.3 km || multiple || 1997–2021 || 05 Jan 2021 || 86 || align=left | Disc.: Spacewatch || 
|- id="2003 WW2" bgcolor=#d6d6d6
| 0 ||  || MBA-O || 16.0 || 3.5 km || multiple || 2001–2021 || 06 Jan 2021 || 202 || align=left | Disc.: Desert Moon Obs. || 
|- id="2003 WA3" bgcolor=#E9E9E9
| 1 ||  || MBA-M || 17.4 || data-sort-value="0.98" | 980 m || multiple || 1999–2021 || 17 Jan 2021 || 63 || align=left | Disc.: CSS || 
|- id="2003 WC3" bgcolor=#fefefe
| 1 ||  || MBA-I || 17.4 || data-sort-value="0.98" | 980 m || multiple || 2003–2020 || 26 Aug 2020 || 185 || align=left | Disc.: NEATAlt.: 2010 UG88 || 
|- id="2003 WG4" bgcolor=#E9E9E9
| 1 ||  || MBA-M || 17.2 || 1.1 km || multiple || 2003–2021 || 11 Jan 2021 || 68 || align=left | Disc.: Spacewatch || 
|- id="2003 WO4" bgcolor=#E9E9E9
| 0 ||  || MBA-M || 17.29 || 1.9 km || multiple || 2003–2021 || 29 Nov 2021 || 124 || align=left | Disc.: SpacewatchAdded on 17 January 2021 || 
|- id="2003 WP4" bgcolor=#E9E9E9
| 0 ||  || MBA-M || 17.7 || 1.2 km || multiple || 2003–2021 || 14 Jan 2021 || 109 || align=left | Disc.: Spacewatch || 
|- id="2003 WQ4" bgcolor=#fefefe
| 0 ||  || MBA-I || 18.6 || data-sort-value="0.57" | 570 m || multiple || 1996–2020 || 15 Dec 2020 || 124 || align=left | Disc.: SpacewatchAlt.: 2017 XT59 || 
|- id="2003 WV4" bgcolor=#E9E9E9
| 0 ||  || MBA-M || 18.4 || data-sort-value="0.88" | 880 m || multiple || 2003–2021 || 11 Jan 2021 || 92 || align=left | Disc.: Spacewatch || 
|- id="2003 WZ4" bgcolor=#E9E9E9
| 2 ||  || MBA-M || 18.4 || data-sort-value="0.62" | 620 m || multiple || 2003–2019 || 21 Oct 2019 || 58 || align=left | Disc.: SpacewatchAlt.: 2015 TB270 || 
|- id="2003 WE5" bgcolor=#E9E9E9
| 2 ||  || MBA-M || 17.3 || 1.0 km || multiple || 2003–2020 || 11 Dec 2020 || 40 || align=left | Disc.: Spacewatch || 
|- id="2003 WF5" bgcolor=#E9E9E9
| 2 ||  || MBA-M || 19.0 || data-sort-value="0.47" | 470 m || multiple || 2003–2011 || 02 Oct 2011 || 41 || align=left | Disc.: SpacewatchAlt.: 2007 TX297 || 
|- id="2003 WW6" bgcolor=#fefefe
| 0 ||  || HUN || 18.5 || data-sort-value="0.59" | 590 m || multiple || 2003–2019 || 28 Nov 2019 || 58 || align=left | Disc.: NEAT || 
|- id="2003 WF7" bgcolor=#fefefe
| 1 ||  || HUN || 17.9 || data-sort-value="0.78" | 780 m || multiple || 2003–2019 || 08 Dec 2019 || 79 || align=left | Disc.: SpacewatchAlt.: 2018 JN3 || 
|- id="2003 WP7" bgcolor=#FFC2E0
| 1 ||  || APO || 23.2 || data-sort-value="0.081" | 81 m || multiple || 2003–2010 || 09 Dec 2010 || 102 || align=left | Disc.: SpacewatchAlt.: 2010 WD3, 2010 XK3 || 
|- id="2003 WR7" bgcolor=#FA8072
| – ||  || MCA || 20.3 || data-sort-value="0.26" | 260 m || single || 5 days || 24 Nov 2003 || 31 || align=left | Disc.: LINEAR || 
|- id="2003 WW7" bgcolor=#E9E9E9
| 0 ||  || MBA-M || 17.6 || 1.3 km || multiple || 2003–2021 || 16 Jan 2021 || 59 || align=left | Disc.: NEAT || 
|- id="2003 WZ7" bgcolor=#FA8072
| 1 ||  || MCA || 18.5 || data-sort-value="0.59" | 590 m || multiple || 2003–2021 || 16 Jan 2021 || 81 || align=left | Disc.: NEAT || 
|- id="2003 WA8" bgcolor=#FA8072
| – ||  || MCA || 19.7 || data-sort-value="0.48" | 480 m || single || 2 days || 21 Nov 2003 || 11 || align=left | Disc.: NEAT || 
|- id="2003 WJ8" bgcolor=#fefefe
| 0 ||  || MBA-I || 18.57 || data-sort-value="0.57" | 570 m || multiple || 2003–2021 || 03 Apr 2021 || 72 || align=left | Disc.: SpacewatchAlt.: 2009 PX6 || 
|- id="2003 WO8" bgcolor=#E9E9E9
| 0 ||  || MBA-M || 17.35 || 1.4 km || multiple || 2003–2022 || 27 Jan 2022 || 101 || align=left | Disc.: SpacewatchAlt.: 2011 QF87 || 
|- id="2003 WK9" bgcolor=#d6d6d6
| 0 ||  || MBA-O || 16.0 || 3.5 km || multiple || 2003–2021 || 10 Jan 2021 || 118 || align=left | Disc.: SpacewatchAlt.: 2014 UM218 || 
|- id="2003 WY11" bgcolor=#E9E9E9
| 0 ||  || MBA-M || 17.2 || 1.5 km || multiple || 2003–2021 || 14 Jan 2021 || 238 || align=left | Disc.: NEAT || 
|- id="2003 WM12" bgcolor=#fefefe
| 0 ||  || HUN || 17.6 || data-sort-value="0.90" | 900 m || multiple || 2003–2021 || 12 Jun 2021 || 186 || align=left | Disc.: SpacewatchAlt.: 2013 MD || 
|- id="2003 WV12" bgcolor=#E9E9E9
| 0 ||  || MBA-M || 17.41 || data-sort-value="0.98" | 980 m || multiple || 2003–2021 || 30 Apr 2021 || 61 || align=left | Disc.: LINEAR || 
|- id="2003 WW12" bgcolor=#fefefe
| 0 ||  || HUN || 18.96 || data-sort-value="0.48" | 480 m || multiple || 2003–2021 || 08 Dec 2021 || 125 || align=left | Disc.: LINEARAlt.: 2015 HH117 || 
|- id="2003 WB13" bgcolor=#fefefe
| 1 ||  || MBA-I || 19.00 || data-sort-value="0.47" | 470 m || multiple || 2003–2019 || 01 Jul 2019 || 41 || align=left | Disc.: Mauna Kea Obs. || 
|- id="2003 WD13" bgcolor=#d6d6d6
| 0 ||  || MBA-O || 17.1 || 2.1 km || multiple || 2003–2020 || 23 Oct 2020 || 48 || align=left | Disc.: Mauna Kea Obs.Added on 17 January 2021Alt.: 2013 NZ7 || 
|- id="2003 WV13" bgcolor=#E9E9E9
| 2 ||  || MBA-M || 18.0 || 1.4 km || multiple || 2003–2017 || 22 Nov 2017 || 38 || align=left | Disc.: Spacewatch || 
|- id="2003 WG14" bgcolor=#fefefe
| 0 ||  || MBA-I || 18.4 || data-sort-value="0.62" | 620 m || multiple || 2003–2019 || 24 Oct 2019 || 91 || align=left | Disc.: Spacewatch || 
|- id="2003 WJ14" bgcolor=#d6d6d6
| 1 ||  || MBA-O || 16.9 || 2.3 km || multiple || 2003–2020 || 22 Nov 2020 || 33 || align=left | Disc.: SpacewatchAdded on 17 January 2021 || 
|- id="2003 WQ14" bgcolor=#fefefe
| 0 ||  || MBA-I || 18.80 || data-sort-value="0.52" | 520 m || multiple || 2003–2021 || 30 Nov 2021 || 97 || align=left | Disc.: Spacewatch || 
|- id="2003 WB15" bgcolor=#fefefe
| 0 ||  || MBA-I || 18.94 || data-sort-value="0.48" | 480 m || multiple || 2003–2021 || 29 Nov 2021 || 43 || align=left | Disc.: SpacewatchAlt.: 2017 OY26 || 
|- id="2003 WK15" bgcolor=#fefefe
| 0 ||  || MBA-I || 18.9 || data-sort-value="0.49" | 490 m || multiple || 2003–2019 || 19 Nov 2019 || 48 || align=left | Disc.: Spacewatch || 
|- id="2003 WU15" bgcolor=#d6d6d6
| 0 ||  || MBA-O || 17.1 || 2.1 km || multiple || 2003–2021 || 16 Jan 2021 || 97 || align=left | Disc.: SpacewatchAlt.: 2014 TG69 || 
|- id="2003 WA16" bgcolor=#d6d6d6
| 0 ||  || MBA-O || 16.8 || 2.4 km || multiple || 2003–2020 || 10 Dec 2020 || 66 || align=left | Disc.: Spacewatch || 
|- id="2003 WJ16" bgcolor=#E9E9E9
| 1 ||  || MBA-M || 17.79 || 1.5 km || multiple || 2001–2021 || 28 Sep 2021 || 46 || align=left | Disc.: SpacewatchAdded on 17 June 2021 || 
|- id="2003 WC17" bgcolor=#fefefe
| 0 ||  || MBA-I || 17.6 || data-sort-value="0.90" | 900 m || multiple || 2003–2021 || 05 Jan 2021 || 173 || align=left | Disc.: NEAT || 
|- id="2003 WU17" bgcolor=#fefefe
| 0 ||  || MBA-I || 18.3 || data-sort-value="0.65" | 650 m || multiple || 2003–2020 || 20 Oct 2020 || 103 || align=left | Disc.: SpacewatchAlt.: 2015 FK180 || 
|- id="2003 WX17" bgcolor=#d6d6d6
| 0 ||  || MBA-O || 16.9 || 2.3 km || multiple || 2003–2020 || 15 Nov 2020 || 77 || align=left | Disc.: SpacewatchAlt.: 2009 WH81 || 
|- id="2003 WF18" bgcolor=#E9E9E9
| 0 ||  || MBA-M || 16.7 || 1.9 km || multiple || 2003–2021 || 11 Jan 2021 || 149 || align=left | Disc.: NEATAlt.: 2007 TU174 || 
|- id="2003 WG18" bgcolor=#E9E9E9
| 1 ||  || MBA-M || 16.5 || 2.1 km || multiple || 2003–2021 || 13 Jan 2021 || 145 || align=left | Disc.: NEAT || 
|- id="2003 WP18" bgcolor=#d6d6d6
| 0 ||  || MBA-O || 16.29 || 3.1 km || multiple || 2003–2021 || 10 Apr 2021 || 174 || align=left | Disc.: LINEARAlt.: 2008 ST6, 2010 HA6, 2011 EX99 || 
|- id="2003 WP21" bgcolor=#FFC2E0
| 4 ||  || APO || 21.5 || data-sort-value="0.18" | 180 m || multiple || 2003–2020 || 17 Nov 2020 || 66 || align=left | Disc.: LINEARPotentially hazardous objectAlt.: 2020 VO6 || 
|- id="2003 WQ21" bgcolor=#FFC2E0
| 6 ||  || AMO || 22.4 || data-sort-value="0.12" | 120 m || single || 18 days || 08 Dec 2003 || 24 || align=left | Disc.: CSS || 
|- id="2003 WU21" bgcolor=#FFC2E0
| 0 ||  || ATE || 21.9 || data-sort-value="0.15" | 150 m || multiple || 2003–2016 || 27 Nov 2016 || 125 || align=left | Disc.: LINEAR || 
|- id="2003 WZ21" bgcolor=#FA8072
| 2 ||  || MCA || 19.1 || data-sort-value="0.64" | 640 m || multiple || 2003–2021 || 02 Jan 2021 || 38 || align=left | Disc.: LONEOS || 
|- id="2003 WD22" bgcolor=#fefefe
| 0 ||  || MBA-I || 19.13 || data-sort-value="0.44" | 440 m || multiple || 2003–2019 || 29 Sep 2019 || 80 || align=left | Disc.: LINEAR || 
|- id="2003 WD23" bgcolor=#E9E9E9
| 0 ||  || MBA-M || 17.6 || 1.3 km || multiple || 2003–2020 || 17 Dec 2020 || 59 || align=left | Disc.: SpacewatchAlt.: 2017 BS113 || 
|- id="2003 WH23" bgcolor=#E9E9E9
| 1 ||  || MBA-M || 18.2 || data-sort-value="0.68" | 680 m || multiple || 2003–2019 || 26 Nov 2019 || 128 || align=left | Disc.: SpacewatchAlt.: 2007 VS89 || 
|- id="2003 WW23" bgcolor=#d6d6d6
| 0 ||  || MBA-O || 16.41 || 2.9 km || multiple || 2001–2021 || 12 May 2021 || 96 || align=left | Disc.: Spacewatch || 
|- id="2003 WG24" bgcolor=#E9E9E9
| 1 ||  || MBA-M || 16.7 || 1.9 km || multiple || 2000–2021 || 09 Jan 2021 || 104 || align=left | Disc.: LINEARAlt.: 2000 AC246, 2012 YS6 || 
|- id="2003 WR25" bgcolor=#FFC2E0
| 5 ||  || APO || 19.6 || data-sort-value="0.43" | 430 m || single || 35 days || 26 Dec 2003 || 61 || align=left | Disc.: NEAT || 
|- id="2003 WW25" bgcolor=#FA8072
| 2 ||  || MCA || 19.97 || data-sort-value="0.30" | 300 m || multiple || 2003–2019 || 04 Jul 2019 || 32 || align=left | Disc.: LINEARAlt.: 2019 KP3 || 
|- id="2003 WL26" bgcolor=#E9E9E9
| 3 ||  || MBA-M || 17.1 || 1.1 km || multiple || 2003–2014 || 24 Jun 2014 || 32 || align=left | Disc.: LINEAR || 
|- id="2003 WN26" bgcolor=#FA8072
| – ||  || MCA || 17.3 || 1.5 km || single || 10 days || 01 Dec 2003 || 20 || align=left | Disc.: LINEAR || 
|- id="2003 WO26" bgcolor=#fefefe
| 0 ||  || HUN || 17.9 || data-sort-value="0.78" | 780 m || multiple || 2003–2020 || 19 Jan 2020 || 101 || align=left | Disc.: LINEARAlt.: 2011 UA194, 2015 BW4 || 
|- id="2003 WW26" bgcolor=#FFC2E0
| 6 ||  || APO || 22.5 || data-sort-value="0.11" | 110 m || single || 23 days || 14 Dec 2003 || 84 || align=left | Disc.: LINEAR || 
|- id="2003 WE27" bgcolor=#d6d6d6
| 0 ||  || MBA-O || 16.45 || 2.9 km || multiple || 2003–2022 || 27 Jan 2022 || 148 || align=left | Disc.: SpacewatchAlt.: 2014 VT4 || 
|- id="2003 WK28" bgcolor=#fefefe
| 0 ||  || MBA-I || 18.4 || data-sort-value="0.62" | 620 m || multiple || 2003–2020 || 09 Oct 2020 || 70 || align=left | Disc.: Spacewatch || 
|- id="2003 WU29" bgcolor=#fefefe
| 0 ||  || MBA-I || 17.73 || data-sort-value="0.85" | 850 m || multiple || 2003–2021 || 08 May 2021 || 54 || align=left | Disc.: Spacewatch || 
|- id="2003 WW30" bgcolor=#E9E9E9
| 0 ||  || MBA-M || 17.8 || 1.2 km || multiple || 2003–2020 || 11 Dec 2020 || 94 || align=left | Disc.: SpacewatchAlt.: 2007 TY219 || 
|- id="2003 WX30" bgcolor=#E9E9E9
| 0 ||  || MBA-M || 17.34 || 1.9 km || multiple || 2003–2022 || 21 Jan 2022 || 192 || align=left | Disc.: SpacewatchAlt.: 2012 TX213 || 
|- id="2003 WD32" bgcolor=#E9E9E9
| 0 ||  || MBA-M || 18.0 || 1.1 km || multiple || 2003–2021 || 05 Jan 2021 || 212 || align=left | Disc.: SpacewatchAlt.: 2016 WY19 || 
|- id="2003 WO32" bgcolor=#E9E9E9
| – ||  || MBA-M || 19.3 || data-sort-value="0.41" | 410 m || single || 3 days || 21 Nov 2003 || 11 || align=left | Disc.: Spacewatch || 
|- id="2003 WU32" bgcolor=#E9E9E9
| 0 ||  || MBA-M || 17.2 || 1.5 km || multiple || 2003–2021 || 06 Jan 2021 || 178 || align=left | Disc.: NEAT || 
|- id="2003 WH33" bgcolor=#fefefe
| 0 ||  || MBA-I || 18.64 || data-sort-value="0.56" | 560 m || multiple || 2003–2022 || 07 Jan 2022 || 125 || align=left | Disc.: NEAT || 
|- id="2003 WW35" bgcolor=#E9E9E9
| 0 ||  || MBA-M || 17.1 || 1.1 km || multiple || 2003–2021 || 09 Jan 2021 || 84 || align=left | Disc.: CSS || 
|- id="2003 WL36" bgcolor=#E9E9E9
| 0 ||  || MBA-M || 17.2 || 1.5 km || multiple || 2003–2021 || 09 Jan 2021 || 110 || align=left | Disc.: SpacewatchAlt.: 2015 OF56 || 
|- id="2003 WQ36" bgcolor=#E9E9E9
| 1 ||  || MBA-M || 16.4 || 2.2 km || multiple || 2003–2021 || 12 Jan 2021 || 199 || align=left | Disc.: LINEAR || 
|- id="2003 WZ37" bgcolor=#d6d6d6
| 0 ||  || MBA-O || 16.00 || 3.5 km || multiple || 2003–2022 || 27 Jan 2022 || 143 || align=left | Disc.: LINEARAlt.: 2010 FA37, 2014 XZ9 || 
|- id="2003 WF38" bgcolor=#E9E9E9
| 0 ||  || MBA-M || 17.8 || 1.2 km || multiple || 2003–2021 || 06 Jan 2021 || 127 || align=left | Disc.: LINEAR || 
|- id="2003 WM38" bgcolor=#E9E9E9
| 0 ||  || MBA-M || 17.83 || 1.1 km || multiple || 2003–2021 || 27 Dec 2021 || 73 || align=left | Disc.: LINEARAlt.: 2012 XL36 || 
|- id="2003 WX38" bgcolor=#d6d6d6
| 0 ||  || HIL || 16.0 || 3.5 km || multiple || 2003–2020 || 04 Jan 2020 || 71 || align=left | Disc.: Spacewatch || 
|- id="2003 WQ41" bgcolor=#E9E9E9
| 1 ||  || MBA-M || 16.9 || 2.3 km || multiple || 2003–2020 || 23 May 2020 || 39 || align=left | Disc.: LINEAR || 
|- id="2003 WR41" bgcolor=#E9E9E9
| 0 ||  || MBA-M || 16.73 || 2.5 km || multiple || 1998–2021 || 07 Aug 2021 || 127 || align=left | Disc.: LINEARAlt.: 2010 BF18, 2010 NK121, 2015 HY164 || 
|- id="2003 WU41" bgcolor=#FA8072
| 0 ||  || MCA || 18.41 || 1.2 km || multiple || 2003–2022 || 27 Jan 2022 || 225 || align=left | Disc.: LINEAR || 
|- id="2003 WJ43" bgcolor=#d6d6d6
| 0 ||  || MBA-O || 17.01 || 2.2 km || multiple || 2003–2021 || 14 Apr 2021 || 101 || align=left | Disc.: NEATAlt.: 2010 HG101 || 
|- id="2003 WZ44" bgcolor=#fefefe
| 0 ||  || MBA-I || 17.5 || data-sort-value="0.94" | 940 m || multiple || 1997–2020 || 28 Apr 2020 || 180 || align=left | Disc.: NEAT || 
|- id="2003 WX45" bgcolor=#fefefe
| 0 ||  || HUN || 18.94 || data-sort-value="0.48" | 480 m || multiple || 2003–2022 || 07 Jan 2022 || 85 || align=left | Disc.: Spacewatch || 
|- id="2003 WA46" bgcolor=#FA8072
| 2 ||  || MCA || 19.3 || data-sort-value="0.41" | 410 m || multiple || 2003–2020 || 21 Jul 2020 || 37 || align=left | Disc.: LINEARAlt.: 2018 YN2 || 
|- id="2003 WB46" bgcolor=#FA8072
| 0 ||  || MCA || 18.5 || data-sort-value="0.59" | 590 m || multiple || 2003–2019 || 29 Sep 2019 || 87 || align=left | Disc.: LINEARAlt.: 2013 YC145 || 
|- id="2003 WE46" bgcolor=#E9E9E9
| 2 ||  || MBA-M || 17.1 || 1.1 km || multiple || 2003–2020 || 23 Dec 2020 || 45 || align=left | Disc.: LINEARAlt.: 2007 VV297 || 
|- id="2003 WT46" bgcolor=#fefefe
| 1 ||  || MBA-I || 18.5 || data-sort-value="0.59" | 590 m || multiple || 2003–2020 || 15 Dec 2020 || 33 || align=left | Disc.: NEAT || 
|- id="2003 WL47" bgcolor=#E9E9E9
| 1 ||  || MBA-M || 18.2 || data-sort-value="0.96" | 960 m || multiple || 2003–2020 || 08 Dec 2020 || 55 || align=left | Disc.: SpacewatchAdded on 17 January 2021 || 
|- id="2003 WO47" bgcolor=#E9E9E9
| 1 ||  || MBA-M || 18.98 || data-sort-value="0.67" | 670 m || multiple || 2003–2022 || 27 Jan 2022 || 39 || align=left | Disc.: SpacewatchAdded on 29 January 2022 || 
|- id="2003 WX47" bgcolor=#E9E9E9
| 0 ||  || MBA-M || 16.7 || 1.4 km || multiple || 2003–2021 || 17 Jan 2021 || 165 || align=left | Disc.: SpacewatchAlt.: 2014 LG10 || 
|- id="2003 WB48" bgcolor=#E9E9E9
| 2 ||  || MBA-M || 18.0 || 1.4 km || multiple || 2003–2018 || 12 Jan 2018 || 53 || align=left | Disc.: Spacewatch || 
|- id="2003 WH48" bgcolor=#E9E9E9
| 0 ||  || MBA-M || 18.84 || data-sort-value="0.72" | 720 m || multiple || 2003–2020 || 18 Sep 2020 || 35 || align=left | Disc.: Spacewatch || 
|- id="2003 WJ48" bgcolor=#E9E9E9
| 0 ||  || MBA-M || 18.2 || data-sort-value="0.96" | 960 m || multiple || 2003–2020 || 10 Aug 2020 || 43 || align=left | Disc.: Spacewatch || 
|- id="2003 WP48" bgcolor=#d6d6d6
| 0 ||  || MBA-O || 16.3 || 3.1 km || multiple || 2003–2021 || 17 Jan 2021 || 112 || align=left | Disc.: Spacewatch || 
|- id="2003 WR48" bgcolor=#fefefe
| 0 ||  || MBA-I || 17.7 || data-sort-value="0.86" | 860 m || multiple || 2003–2021 || 09 Jan 2021 || 107 || align=left | Disc.: SpacewatchAlt.: 2006 QH179 || 
|- id="2003 WV48" bgcolor=#d6d6d6
| 0 ||  || MBA-O || 18.0 || 1.4 km || multiple || 2003–2020 || 22 Apr 2020 || 50 || align=left | Disc.: LPL/Spacewatch IIAdded on 22 July 2020Alt.: 2008 TT109 || 
|- id="2003 WF49" bgcolor=#d6d6d6
| 0 ||  || HIL || 16.4 || 2.9 km || multiple || 2002–2018 || 03 Oct 2018 || 46 || align=left | Disc.: LPL/Spacewatch IIAlt.: 2011 UA249 || 
|- id="2003 WE50" bgcolor=#fefefe
| 0 ||  || MBA-I || 17.8 || data-sort-value="0.82" | 820 m || multiple || 2003–2021 || 17 Jan 2021 || 83 || align=left | Disc.: LINEARAlt.: 2015 FO37 || 
|- id="2003 WR50" bgcolor=#d6d6d6
| 1 ||  || MBA-O || 17.2 || 2.0 km || multiple || 2003–2019 || 25 Nov 2019 || 37 || align=left | Disc.: LPL/Spacewatch II || 
|- id="2003 WS50" bgcolor=#E9E9E9
| 0 ||  || MBA-M || 17.41 || 1.8 km || multiple || 2003–2021 || 17 Aug 2021 || 76 || align=left | Disc.: LPL/Spacewatch IIAlt.: 2010 BD148 || 
|- id="2003 WY50" bgcolor=#E9E9E9
| 2 ||  || MBA-M || 18.5 || data-sort-value="0.59" | 590 m || multiple || 1999–2019 || 26 Sep 2019 || 54 || align=left | Disc.: LPL/Spacewatch IIAlt.: 2015 RY42 || 
|- id="2003 WC51" bgcolor=#d6d6d6
| 0 ||  || MBA-O || 16.5 || 2.8 km || multiple || 2001–2021 || 17 Jan 2021 || 84 || align=left | Disc.: LPL/Spacewatch IIAlt.: 2012 JF62 || 
|- id="2003 WG51" bgcolor=#E9E9E9
| 1 ||  || MBA-M || 18.1 || data-sort-value="0.71" | 710 m || multiple || 2003–2021 || 18 Jan 2021 || 109 || align=left | Disc.: Spacewatch || 
|- id="2003 WH51" bgcolor=#d6d6d6
| 0 ||  || MBA-O || 16.8 || 2.4 km || multiple || 2003–2021 || 16 Jan 2021 || 67 || align=left | Disc.: Spacewatch || 
|- id="2003 WJ51" bgcolor=#E9E9E9
| 0 ||  || MBA-M || 16.9 || 1.2 km || multiple || 2003–2021 || 10 Jan 2021 || 75 || align=left | Disc.: Spacewatch || 
|- id="2003 WK51" bgcolor=#E9E9E9
| 0 ||  || MBA-M || 17.56 || 1.7 km || multiple || 2003–2021 || 11 Sep 2021 || 63 || align=left | Disc.: Spacewatch || 
|- id="2003 WO52" bgcolor=#d6d6d6
| 0 ||  || MBA-O || 16.36 || 3.6 km || multiple || 2003–2022 || 05 Jan 2022 || 94 || align=left | Disc.: SpacewatchAlt.: 2010 EW17 || 
|- id="2003 WA53" bgcolor=#d6d6d6
| 0 ||  || MBA-O || 16.5 || 2.8 km || multiple || 2003–2021 || 06 Jan 2021 || 172 || align=left | Disc.: SpacewatchAlt.: 2010 AX71, 2011 GO52 || 
|- id="2003 WB53" bgcolor=#fefefe
| 0 ||  || MBA-I || 18.34 || data-sort-value="0.64" | 640 m || multiple || 2003–2021 || 08 Sep 2021 || 77 || align=left | Disc.: SpacewatchAlt.: 2014 TW47 || 
|- id="2003 WC53" bgcolor=#d6d6d6
| 0 ||  || MBA-O || 16.7 || 2.5 km || multiple || 2003–2020 || 23 Dec 2020 || 64 || align=left | Disc.: Spacewatch || 
|- id="2003 WD53" bgcolor=#d6d6d6
| 0 ||  || MBA-O || 16.4 || 2.9 km || multiple || 2003–2021 || 24 Jan 2021 || 71 || align=left | Disc.: Spacewatch || 
|- id="2003 WG53" bgcolor=#fefefe
| 3 ||  || MBA-I || 18.8 || data-sort-value="0.52" | 520 m || multiple || 2003–2012 || 14 Jan 2012 || 25 || align=left | Disc.: SpacewatchAdded on 22 July 2020 || 
|- id="2003 WJ53" bgcolor=#d6d6d6
| 0 ||  || MBA-O || 16.9 || 2.3 km || multiple || 2003–2019 || 25 Nov 2019 || 70 || align=left | Disc.: Spacewatch || 
|- id="2003 WV53" bgcolor=#E9E9E9
| 1 ||  || MBA-M || 17.5 || 1.3 km || multiple || 2003–2021 || 14 Jan 2021 || 110 || align=left | Disc.: LINEAR || 
|- id="2003 WX53" bgcolor=#FA8072
| 1 ||  || MCA || 18.8 || data-sort-value="0.52" | 520 m || multiple || 2003–2019 || 25 Nov 2019 || 95 || align=left | Disc.: LINEAR || 
|- id="2003 WK54" bgcolor=#E9E9E9
| 0 ||  || MBA-M || 17.11 || 1.1 km || multiple || 1995–2021 || 07 Apr 2021 || 115 || align=left | Disc.: LINEAR || 
|- id="2003 WR54" bgcolor=#fefefe
| 0 ||  || MBA-I || 18.5 || data-sort-value="0.59" | 590 m || multiple || 2003–2020 || 17 Dec 2020 || 107 || align=left | Disc.: LINEAR || 
|- id="2003 WT54" bgcolor=#E9E9E9
| 2 ||  || MBA-M || 17.5 || data-sort-value="0.94" | 940 m || multiple || 2003–2015 || 10 Aug 2015 || 69 || align=left | Disc.: LINEARAlt.: 2007 UY9 || 
|- id="2003 WS57" bgcolor=#fefefe
| 0 ||  || MBA-I || 17.9 || data-sort-value="0.78" | 780 m || multiple || 2003–2021 || 05 Jan 2021 || 137 || align=left | Disc.: SpacewatchAlt.: 2015 DD39 || 
|- id="2003 WV57" bgcolor=#E9E9E9
| 0 ||  || MBA-M || 17.9 || data-sort-value="0.78" | 780 m || multiple || 2003–2021 || 17 Jan 2021 || 40 || align=left | Disc.: SpacewatchAdded on 11 May 2021Alt.: 2020 YY7 || 
|- id="2003 WU58" bgcolor=#d6d6d6
| 0 ||  || HIL || 15.5 || 4.4 km || multiple || 2002–2021 || 18 Jan 2021 || 179 || align=left | Disc.: SpacewatchAlt.: 2010 JA63, 2011 UP114 || 
|- id="2003 WB59" bgcolor=#fefefe
| 0 ||  || MBA-I || 17.7 || data-sort-value="0.86" | 860 m || multiple || 2003–2018 || 05 Oct 2018 || 82 || align=left | Disc.: Spacewatch || 
|- id="2003 WQ59" bgcolor=#E9E9E9
| 1 ||  || MBA-M || 18.4 || data-sort-value="0.62" | 620 m || multiple || 2003–2017 || 22 Feb 2017 || 45 || align=left | Disc.: Spacewatch || 
|- id="2003 WU60" bgcolor=#d6d6d6
| 0 ||  || MBA-O || 16.4 || 2.9 km || multiple || 2003–2021 || 21 Jan 2021 || 122 || align=left | Disc.: Spacewatch || 
|- id="2003 WV61" bgcolor=#E9E9E9
| 1 ||  || MBA-M || 18.8 || data-sort-value="0.52" | 520 m || multiple || 2003–2021 || 18 Jan 2021 || 23 || align=left | Disc.: SpacewatchAdded on 21 August 2021 || 
|- id="2003 WG62" bgcolor=#d6d6d6
| 0 ||  || MBA-O || 16.5 || 2.8 km || multiple || 2003–2021 || 11 Jan 2021 || 178 || align=left | Disc.: SpacewatchAlt.: 2014 UM11 || 
|- id="2003 WP64" bgcolor=#d6d6d6
| 0 ||  || MBA-O || 15.95 || 3.6 km || multiple || 2003–2022 || 10 Jan 2022 || 180 || align=left | Disc.: SpacewatchAlt.: 2010 EQ151, 2014 WU499 || 
|- id="2003 WG65" bgcolor=#d6d6d6
| 0 ||  || MBA-O || 16.0 || 3.5 km || multiple || 2003–2021 || 01 Jun 2021 || 199 || align=left | Disc.: SpacewatchAlt.: 2006 KD34, 2010 HZ6, 2014 XK2 || 
|- id="2003 WY69" bgcolor=#FA8072
| 0 ||  || MCA || 19.23 || data-sort-value="0.42" | 420 m || multiple || 2003–2020 || 06 Nov 2020 || 107 || align=left | Disc.: CINEOSAlt.: 2017 YH4 || 
|- id="2003 WR70" bgcolor=#E9E9E9
| 0 ||  || MBA-M || 16.6 || 2.0 km || multiple || 2003–2021 || 08 Jan 2021 || 152 || align=left | Disc.: LINEARAlt.: 2007 VV3, 2011 QU40 || 
|- id="2003 WW70" bgcolor=#E9E9E9
| 0 ||  || MBA-M || 17.32 || 1.4 km || multiple || 2003–2022 || 26 Jan 2022 || 131 || align=left | Disc.: NEAT || 
|- id="2003 WC76" bgcolor=#fefefe
| 1 ||  || MBA-I || 17.7 || data-sort-value="0.86" | 860 m || multiple || 1996–2021 || 04 Jan 2021 || 79 || align=left | Disc.: LINEARAlt.: 2006 PO1, 2013 TW118 || 
|- id="2003 WS77" bgcolor=#E9E9E9
| 0 ||  || MBA-M || 17.10 || 2.1 km || multiple || 2003–2021 || 31 Oct 2021 || 99 || align=left | Disc.: NEATAlt.: 2014 CG9 || 
|- id="2003 WP78" bgcolor=#d6d6d6
| 0 ||  || MBA-O || 16.0 || 3.5 km || multiple || 2003–2021 || 18 Jan 2021 || 159 || align=left | Disc.: LINEAR || 
|- id="2003 WV80" bgcolor=#d6d6d6
| 0 ||  || MBA-O || 16.28 || 3.1 km || multiple || 2003–2021 || 14 May 2021 || 96 || align=left | Disc.: NEAT || 
|- id="2003 WL82" bgcolor=#d6d6d6
| 0 ||  || MBA-O || 16.24 || 3.1 km || multiple || 2003–2022 || 25 Jan 2022 || 266 || align=left | Disc.: NEATAlt.: 2014 SP197 || 
|- id="2003 WZ82" bgcolor=#d6d6d6
| 0 ||  || MBA-O || 16.9 || 2.3 km || multiple || 2003–2021 || 11 Jan 2021 || 141 || align=left | Disc.: LINEARAlt.: 2014 WX15 || 
|- id="2003 WD84" bgcolor=#d6d6d6
| 0 ||  || MBA-O || 16.0 || 3.5 km || multiple || 2003–2020 || 23 Nov 2020 || 48 || align=left | Disc.: LPL/Spacewatch II || 
|- id="2003 WE84" bgcolor=#E9E9E9
| 3 ||  || MBA-M || 18.2 || data-sort-value="0.96" | 960 m || multiple || 2003–2020 || 14 Nov 2020 || 46 || align=left | Disc.: LPL/Spacewatch II || 
|- id="2003 WJ85" bgcolor=#E9E9E9
| 0 ||  || MBA-M || 17.39 || data-sort-value="0.99" | 990 m || multiple || 1999–2021 || 09 May 2021 || 171 || align=left | Disc.: LPL/Spacewatch II || 
|- id="2003 WL85" bgcolor=#fefefe
| 0 ||  || MBA-I || 18.2 || data-sort-value="0.68" | 680 m || multiple || 2003–2019 || 25 Nov 2019 || 87 || align=left | Disc.: LPL/Spacewatch IIAlt.: 2015 FC108 || 
|- id="2003 WM85" bgcolor=#d6d6d6
| 0 ||  || MBA-O || 16.6 || 2.7 km || multiple || 2003–2019 || 05 Nov 2019 || 62 || align=left | Disc.: LPL/Spacewatch IIAlt.: 2010 FS125, 2014 WG240 || 
|- id="2003 WP87" bgcolor=#E9E9E9
| 2 ||  || MBA-M || 18.1 || data-sort-value="0.71" | 710 m || multiple || 2003–2019 || 03 Oct 2019 || 88 || align=left | Disc.: SpacewatchAlt.: 2007 TM263 || 
|- id="2003 WY87" bgcolor=#FFC2E0
| 1 ||  || AMO || 22.3 || data-sort-value="0.12" | 120 m || multiple || 2003–2019 || 11 Jan 2019 || 59 || align=left | Disc.: LINEAR || 
|- id="2003 WB88" bgcolor=#FA8072
| 1 ||  || HUN || 17.9 || data-sort-value="0.78" | 780 m || multiple || 1998–2021 || 11 Jan 2021 || 105 || align=left | Disc.: Tenagra II Obs. || 
|- id="2003 WD88" bgcolor=#FA8072
| 3 ||  || MCA || 18.1 || data-sort-value="0.71" | 710 m || multiple || 2003–2020 || 12 Dec 2020 || 24 || align=left | Disc.: NEAT || 
|- id="2003 WE88" bgcolor=#fefefe
| 1 ||  || HUN || 18.4 || data-sort-value="0.62" | 620 m || multiple || 2003–2021 || 08 Jun 2021 || 138 || align=left | Disc.: SpacewatchAlt.: 2011 UG195 || 
|- id="2003 WL88" bgcolor=#fefefe
| 0 ||  || HUN || 18.73 || data-sort-value="0.53" | 530 m || multiple || 2003–2021 || 27 Jul 2021 || 56 || align=left | Disc.: LINEAR || 
|- id="2003 WW89" bgcolor=#E9E9E9
| 0 ||  || MBA-M || 17.38 || 1.9 km || multiple || 2003–2021 || 06 Nov 2021 || 100 || align=left | Disc.: SpacewatchAlt.: 2012 TZ187 || 
|- id="2003 WL90" bgcolor=#d6d6d6
| 0 ||  || MBA-O || 16.91 || 2.3 km || multiple || 2003–2021 || 14 Apr 2021 || 135 || align=left | Disc.: SpacewatchAlt.: 2014 YG46 || 
|- id="2003 WS90" bgcolor=#E9E9E9
| 0 ||  || MBA-M || 16.9 || 1.8 km || multiple || 2003–2021 || 06 Jan 2021 || 195 || align=left | Disc.: NEATAlt.: 2009 BL54 || 
|- id="2003 WU90" bgcolor=#fefefe
| 0 ||  || MBA-I || 18.8 || data-sort-value="0.52" | 520 m || multiple || 2003–2020 || 15 Oct 2020 || 75 || align=left | Disc.: Spacewatch || 
|- id="2003 WV90" bgcolor=#fefefe
| 0 ||  || MBA-I || 18.5 || data-sort-value="0.59" | 590 m || multiple || 2003–2020 || 03 Feb 2020 || 88 || align=left | Disc.: Spacewatch || 
|- id="2003 WZ92" bgcolor=#d6d6d6
| 0 ||  || MBA-O || 16.16 || 3.3 km || multiple || 2003–2022 || 26 Jan 2022 || 152 || align=left | Disc.: LONEOSAlt.: 2014 WE114 || 
|- id="2003 WJ94" bgcolor=#E9E9E9
| 0 ||  || MBA-M || 18.0 || 1.1 km || multiple || 2003–2021 || 05 Jan 2021 || 195 || align=left | Disc.: LONEOSAlt.: 2013 AA148 || 
|- id="2003 WO96" bgcolor=#fefefe
| 0 ||  || MBA-I || 17.95 || data-sort-value="0.76" | 760 m || multiple || 2003–2021 || 31 Jul 2021 || 95 || align=left | Disc.: LONEOSAlt.: 2014 TJ67 || 
|- id="2003 WO97" bgcolor=#E9E9E9
| 0 ||  || MBA-M || 17.61 || 1.7 km || multiple || 2003–2021 || 05 Oct 2021 || 78 || align=left | Disc.: LONEOSAlt.: 2012 TE41 || 
|- id="2003 WH98" bgcolor=#FFC2E0
| 5 ||  || APO || 26.6 || data-sort-value="0.017" | 17 m || single || 4 days || 30 Nov 2003 || 36 || align=left | Disc.: LINEAR || 
|- id="2003 WJ98" bgcolor=#FFC2E0
| 1 ||  || APO || 22.9 || data-sort-value="0.093" | 93 m || multiple || 2003–2020 || 06 Dec 2020 || 45 || align=left | Disc.: LINEARAMO at MPC || 
|- id="2003 WM98" bgcolor=#d6d6d6
| 0 ||  || MBA-O || 16.8 || 2.4 km || multiple || 2003–2020 || 18 Apr 2020 || 73 || align=left | Disc.: NEAT || 
|- id="2003 WW99" bgcolor=#d6d6d6
| 1 ||  || MBA-O || 16.8 || 2.4 km || multiple || 2003–2021 || 15 Jan 2021 || 171 || align=left | Disc.: LINEAR || 
|- id="2003 WA100" bgcolor=#d6d6d6
| 1 ||  || MBA-O || 15.9 || 3.7 km || multiple || 2003–2020 || 25 Jan 2020 || 312 || align=left | Disc.: LINEARAlt.: 2014 XT15 || 
|- id="2003 WN100" bgcolor=#fefefe
| 1 ||  || HUN || 17.5 || data-sort-value="0.94" | 940 m || multiple || 2002–2020 || 01 Feb 2020 || 146 || align=left | Disc.: NEAT || 
|- id="2003 WP102" bgcolor=#d6d6d6
| 0 ||  || MBA-O || 16.27 || 3.1 km || multiple || 2003–2021 || 18 Jan 2021 || 152 || align=left | Disc.: LINEARAlt.: 2010 FS72 || 
|- id="2003 WT104" bgcolor=#E9E9E9
| 0 ||  || MBA-M || 16.6 || 2.0 km || multiple || 2003–2021 || 15 Jan 2021 || 150 || align=left | Disc.: LINEAR || 
|- id="2003 WH105" bgcolor=#d6d6d6
| 0 ||  || MBA-O || 16.7 || 2.5 km || multiple || 2003–2021 || 21 Jan 2021 || 78 || align=left | Disc.: LPL/Spacewatch IIAlt.: 2010 GV185 || 
|- id="2003 WK105" bgcolor=#E9E9E9
| 2 ||  || MBA-M || 18.0 || data-sort-value="0.75" | 750 m || multiple || 2003–2019 || 29 Nov 2019 || 93 || align=left | Disc.: LINEARAlt.: 2007 VD87 || 
|- id="2003 WQ105" bgcolor=#d6d6d6
| 1 ||  || MBA-O || 17.1 || 2.1 km || multiple || 2003–2019 || 26 Sep 2019 || 25 || align=left | Disc.: LPL/Spacewatch IIAdded on 21 August 2021Alt.: 2019 PR57 || 
|- id="2003 WR105" bgcolor=#d6d6d6
| 0 ||  || MBA-O || 17.4 || 1.8 km || multiple || 2003–2021 || 18 Jan 2021 || 52 || align=left | Disc.: LPL/Spacewatch II || 
|- id="2003 WW105" bgcolor=#E9E9E9
| 0 ||  || MBA-M || 17.7 || data-sort-value="0.86" | 860 m || multiple || 2003–2021 || 17 Jan 2021 || 43 || align=left | Disc.: LPL/Spacewatch IIAdded on 11 May 2021 || 
|- id="2003 WZ105" bgcolor=#fefefe
| 0 ||  || MBA-I || 18.2 || data-sort-value="0.68" | 680 m || multiple || 2003–2020 || 12 Jun 2020 || 45 || align=left | Disc.: LPL/Spacewatch II || 
|- id="2003 WC106" bgcolor=#fefefe
| 0 ||  || MBA-I || 17.40 || data-sort-value="0.98" | 980 m || multiple || 1995–2021 || 11 Jul 2021 || 157 || align=left | Disc.: LPL/Spacewatch IIAlt.: 2014 QG73 || 
|- id="2003 WD106" bgcolor=#E9E9E9
| 0 ||  || MBA-M || 17.48 || 1.8 km || multiple || 2003–2021 || 30 Nov 2021 || 113 || align=left | Disc.: LPL/Spacewatch IIAlt.: 2007 RB89, 2014 EB60 || 
|- id="2003 WU106" bgcolor=#d6d6d6
| 0 ||  || MBA-O || 16.4 || 2.9 km || multiple || 2003–2021 || 18 Jan 2021 || 118 || align=left | Disc.: SpacewatchAlt.: 2016 CC211 || 
|- id="2003 WY106" bgcolor=#E9E9E9
| 0 ||  || MBA-M || 18.3 || data-sort-value="0.92" | 920 m || multiple || 2003–2020 || 08 Oct 2020 || 112 || align=left | Disc.: SpacewatchAlt.: 2016 WW18 || 
|- id="2003 WT107" bgcolor=#fefefe
| 0 ||  || MBA-I || 18.37 || data-sort-value="0.63" | 630 m || multiple || 2003–2021 || 29 Nov 2021 || 77 || align=left | Disc.: SpacewatchAlt.: 2010 TD185 || 
|- id="2003 WB109" bgcolor=#d6d6d6
| 0 ||  || MBA-O || 16.75 || 2.5 km || multiple || 2003–2021 || 12 May 2021 || 95 || align=left | Disc.: LINEARAlt.: 2010 KA89, 2013 SJ3 || 
|- id="2003 WA110" bgcolor=#d6d6d6
| 0 ||  || MBA-O || 15.5 || 4.4 km || multiple || 2003–2021 || 13 Jan 2021 || 273 || align=left | Disc.: LINEARAlt.: 2010 FM38 || 
|- id="2003 WQ110" bgcolor=#d6d6d6
| 1 ||  || MBA-O || 17.45 || 1.8 km || multiple || 2003–2020 || 28 Jan 2020 || 83 || align=left | Disc.: LINEAR || 
|- id="2003 WC114" bgcolor=#E9E9E9
| 0 ||  || MBA-M || 17.3 || 1.5 km || multiple || 2003–2021 || 05 Jan 2021 || 156 || align=left | Disc.: LINEAR || 
|- id="2003 WF115" bgcolor=#d6d6d6
| 0 ||  || MBA-O || 16.2 || 3.2 km || multiple || 2003–2021 || 18 Jan 2021 || 118 || align=left | Disc.: LINEARAlt.: 2014 WK128 || 
|- id="2003 WJ116" bgcolor=#E9E9E9
| 0 ||  || MBA-M || 17.42 || data-sort-value="0.98" | 980 m || multiple || 2003–2021 || 09 Apr 2021 || 93 || align=left | Disc.: LINEAR || 
|- id="2003 WR128" bgcolor=#E9E9E9
| 4 ||  || MBA-M || 17.6 || data-sort-value="0.90" | 900 m || multiple || 2003–2015 || 12 Sep 2015 || 17 || align=left | Disc.: Spacewatch || 
|- id="2003 WT128" bgcolor=#d6d6d6
| 0 ||  || MBA-O || 16.5 || 2.8 km || multiple || 2003–2021 || 14 Jan 2021 || 75 || align=left | Disc.: SpacewatchAlt.: 2014 SY309 || 
|- id="2003 WS142" bgcolor=#E9E9E9
| 1 ||  || MBA-M || 17.3 || 1.5 km || multiple || 2003–2021 || 17 Jan 2021 || 103 || align=left | Disc.: NEATAlt.: 2008 BF14 || 
|- id="2003 WW143" bgcolor=#fefefe
| 0 ||  || MBA-I || 18.1 || data-sort-value="0.71" | 710 m || multiple || 2003–2021 || 04 Jan 2021 || 114 || align=left | Disc.: LINEARAlt.: 2015 FG226 || 
|- id="2003 WU144" bgcolor=#fefefe
| 2 ||  || MBA-I || 17.9 || data-sort-value="0.78" | 780 m || multiple || 1991–2020 || 25 Feb 2020 || 126 || align=left | Disc.: LINEARAlt.: 2016 AC81 || 
|- id="2003 WD145" bgcolor=#E9E9E9
| 1 ||  || MBA-M || 18.1 || 1.0 km || multiple || 2003–2020 || 16 Nov 2020 || 121 || align=left | Disc.: LINEARAlt.: 2016 WN26 || 
|- id="2003 WF147" bgcolor=#fefefe
| 0 ||  || HUN || 18.78 || data-sort-value="0.52" | 520 m || multiple || 2003–2021 || 16 Nov 2021 || 57 || align=left | Disc.: LPL/Spacewatch IIAlt.: 2015 GD1 || 
|- id="2003 WO147" bgcolor=#d6d6d6
| 0 ||  || MBA-O || 16.7 || 2.5 km || multiple || 1992–2021 || 04 Jan 2021 || 152 || align=left | Disc.: SpacewatchAlt.: 2014 SL212, 2014 WH256 || 
|- id="2003 WJ151" bgcolor=#d6d6d6
| 0 ||  || MBA-O || 16.7 || 2.5 km || multiple || 2003–2021 || 22 Jan 2021 || 85 || align=left | Disc.: Spacewatch || 
|- id="2003 WO151" bgcolor=#FFC2E0
| 4 ||  || APO || 20.4 || data-sort-value="0.30" | 300 m || multiple || 2003–2005 || 05 Dec 2005 || 41 || align=left | Disc.: Spacewatch || 
|- id="2003 WE152" bgcolor=#d6d6d6
| 0 ||  || MBA-O || 18.00 || 1.4 km || multiple || 2003–2021 || 09 Feb 2021 || 41 || align=left | Disc.: SpacewatchAdded on 5 November 2021Alt.: 2014 WU322 || 
|- id="2003 WH152" bgcolor=#E9E9E9
| 0 ||  || MBA-M || 17.1 || 1.1 km || multiple || 2003–2021 || 18 Jan 2021 || 120 || align=left | Disc.: LPL/Spacewatch IIAlt.: 2017 EK18 || 
|- id="2003 WT153" bgcolor=#FFC2E0
| 6 ||  || ATE || 28.0 || data-sort-value="0.0089" | 9 m || single || 3 days || 01 Dec 2003 || 44 || align=left | Disc.: LPL/Spacewatch II || 
|- id="2003 WU153" bgcolor=#FFC2E0
| 0 ||  || AMO || 19.16 || data-sort-value="0.52" | 520 m || multiple || 2003–2022 || 23 Jan 2022 || 73 || align=left | Disc.: LINEAR || 
|- id="2003 WY153" bgcolor=#FFC2E0
| 6 ||  || APO || 24.4 || data-sort-value="0.047" | 47 m || single || 18 days || 17 Dec 2003 || 48 || align=left | Disc.: LINEAR || 
|- id="2003 WA154" bgcolor=#fefefe
| 1 ||  || HUN || 18.0 || data-sort-value="0.75" | 750 m || multiple || 2003–2021 || 01 Jun 2021 || 160 || align=left | Disc.: LINEARAlt.: 2014 WA365 || 
|- id="2003 WO154" bgcolor=#E9E9E9
| 0 ||  || MBA-M || 17.3 || 1.0 km || multiple || 2003–2021 || 18 Jan 2021 || 118 || align=left | Disc.: SpacewatchAlt.: 2017 DT49 || 
|- id="2003 WE157" bgcolor=#FFC2E0
| 4 ||  || APO || 21.2 || data-sort-value="0.20" | 200 m || single || 162 days || 09 May 2004 || 35 || align=left | Disc.: Spacewatch || 
|- id="2003 WV157" bgcolor=#FA8072
| 0 ||  || MCA || 16.76 || 2.5 km || multiple || 2003–2021 || 09 Jul 2021 || 184 || align=left | Disc.: LINEAR || 
|- id="2003 WC158" bgcolor=#FFC2E0
| 0 ||  || APO || 20.4 || data-sort-value="0.30" | 300 m || multiple || 2003–2016 || 03 Jun 2016 || 120 || align=left | Disc.: LONEOSPotentially hazardous object || 
|- id="2003 WP158" bgcolor=#d6d6d6
| 0 ||  || MBA-O || 16.8 || 2.4 km || multiple || 2003–2021 || 06 Jan 2021 || 77 || align=left | Disc.: SpacewatchAlt.: 2014 TC28 || 
|- id="2003 WH159" bgcolor=#E9E9E9
| 0 ||  || MBA-M || 16.88 || 1.3 km || multiple || 2003–2021 || 02 Apr 2021 || 194 || align=left | Disc.: LINEAR || 
|- id="2003 WX159" bgcolor=#fefefe
| 0 ||  || MBA-I || 18.88 || data-sort-value="0.50" | 500 m || multiple || 2003–2021 || 27 Oct 2021 || 86 || align=left | Disc.: LPL/Spacewatch IIAlt.: 2014 XU48 || 
|- id="2003 WZ159" bgcolor=#E9E9E9
| 0 ||  || MBA-M || 18.21 || 1.3 km || multiple || 2003–2021 || 25 Nov 2021 || 60 || align=left | Disc.: LPL/Spacewatch IIAdded on 22 July 2020 || 
|- id="2003 WD160" bgcolor=#d6d6d6
| 0 ||  || MBA-O || 16.69 || 2.6 km || multiple || 2003–2021 || 03 Apr 2021 || 69 || align=left | Disc.: LPL/Spacewatch IIAlt.: 2008 WZ17 || 
|- id="2003 WF160" bgcolor=#fefefe
| 0 ||  || MBA-I || 18.4 || data-sort-value="0.62" | 620 m || multiple || 2003–2021 || 17 Apr 2021 || 62 || align=left | Disc.: LPL/Spacewatch IIAdded on 11 May 2021Alt.: 2021 EJ26 || 
|- id="2003 WJ160" bgcolor=#fefefe
| 0 ||  || MBA-I || 19.21 || data-sort-value="0.43" | 430 m || multiple || 2003–2022 || 07 Jan 2022 || 53 || align=left | Disc.: LPL/Spacewatch II || 
|- id="2003 WU160" bgcolor=#fefefe
| 1 ||  || MBA-I || 19.2 || data-sort-value="0.43" | 430 m || multiple || 2003–2019 || 25 Sep 2019 || 41 || align=left | Disc.: LPL/Spacewatch IIAdded on 22 July 2020Alt.: 2016 UV126 || 
|- id="2003 WW160" bgcolor=#fefefe
| 0 ||  || MBA-I || 18.0 || data-sort-value="0.75" | 750 m || multiple || 1999–2018 || 04 Sep 2018 || 57 || align=left | Disc.: LPL/Spacewatch IIAlt.: 2014 PB62 || 
|- id="2003 WG161" bgcolor=#d6d6d6
| – ||  || MBA-O || 18.4 || 1.2 km || single || 23 days || 16 Dec 2003 || 11 || align=left | Disc.: LPL/Spacewatch II || 
|- id="2003 WJ163" bgcolor=#d6d6d6
| 0 ||  || MBA-O || 17.6 || 1.7 km || multiple || 2001–2021 || 18 Jan 2021 || 62 || align=left | Disc.: LPL/Spacewatch IIAlt.: 2008 SR215 || 
|- id="2003 WP163" bgcolor=#E9E9E9
| 1 ||  || MBA-M || 18.41 || 1.2 km || multiple || 2003–2021 || 25 Nov 2021 || 39 || align=left | Disc.: Spacewatch || 
|- id="2003 WR163" bgcolor=#E9E9E9
| 0 ||  || MBA-M || 18.41 || 1.2 km || multiple || 2003–2021 || 29 Nov 2021 || 55 || align=left | Disc.: SpacewatchAlt.: 2012 XA90 || 
|- id="2003 WT163" bgcolor=#d6d6d6
| 0 ||  || MBA-O || 16.9 || 2.3 km || multiple || 2003–2021 || 16 Jan 2021 || 96 || align=left | Disc.: SpacewatchAlt.: 2014 SU344 || 
|- id="2003 WU163" bgcolor=#fefefe
| 0 ||  || MBA-I || 18.91 || data-sort-value="0.49" | 490 m || multiple || 2003–2021 || 03 Dec 2021 || 63 || align=left | Disc.: SpacewatchAdded on 5 November 2021 || 
|- id="2003 WN164" bgcolor=#d6d6d6
| 0 ||  || MBA-O || 17.1 || 2.1 km || multiple || 2003–2020 || 21 Mar 2020 || 60 || align=left | Disc.: SpacewatchAdded on 22 July 2020Alt.: 2017 SZ80 || 
|- id="2003 WQ164" bgcolor=#d6d6d6
| 0 ||  || MBA-O || 17.93 || 1.4 km || multiple || 2003–2020 || 29 Apr 2020 || 38 || align=left | Disc.: Spacewatch || 
|- id="2003 WU164" bgcolor=#fefefe
| 0 ||  || MBA-I || 18.78 || data-sort-value="0.52" | 520 m || multiple || 2003–2021 || 27 Nov 2021 || 70 || align=left | Disc.: SpacewatchAlt.: 2021 SH17 || 
|- id="2003 WX164" bgcolor=#E9E9E9
| 0 ||  || MBA-M || 17.9 || 1.1 km || multiple || 2003–2020 || 05 Nov 2020 || 91 || align=left | Disc.: SpacewatchAlt.: 2013 AC115 || 
|- id="2003 WH165" bgcolor=#d6d6d6
| 0 ||  || MBA-O || 17.16 || 2.1 km || multiple || 2003–2021 || 13 Apr 2021 || 63 || align=left | Disc.: Spacewatch || 
|- id="2003 WM165" bgcolor=#fefefe
| 1 ||  || MBA-I || 19.54 || data-sort-value="0.37" | 370 m || multiple || 2003–2021 || 09 Dec 2021 || 38 || align=left | Disc.: SpacewatchAdded on 24 December 2021 || 
|- id="2003 WR165" bgcolor=#d6d6d6
| 0 ||  || MBA-O || 17.5 || 1.8 km || multiple || 2003–2021 || 15 Apr 2021 || 56 || align=left | Disc.: Spacewatch || 
|- id="2003 WG166" bgcolor=#FFE699
| 1 ||  || Asteroid || 17.4 || 2.0 km || multiple || 2003–2015 || 01 Dec 2015 || 82 || align=left | Disc.: LINEARMBA at MPC || 
|- id="2003 WH166" bgcolor=#FFC2E0
| 1 ||  || APO || 22.0 || data-sort-value="0.14" | 140 m || multiple || 2003–2012 || 27 May 2012 || 167 || align=left | Disc.: SpacewatchPotentially hazardous object || 
|- id="2003 WE168" bgcolor=#fefefe
| 0 ||  || HUN || 18.48 || data-sort-value="0.60" | 600 m || multiple || 2002–2021 || 06 Dec 2021 || 83 || align=left | Disc.: LONEOSAdded on 22 July 2020 || 
|- id="2003 WP168" bgcolor=#E9E9E9
| 0 ||  || MBA-M || 17.0 || 1.2 km || multiple || 2003–2021 || 13 Jan 2021 || 178 || align=left | Disc.: CSSAlt.: 2016 UK31, 2016 YU || 
|- id="2003 WA169" bgcolor=#E9E9E9
| 0 ||  || MBA-M || 17.19 || 2.0 km || multiple || 2003–2022 || 07 Jan 2022 || 189 || align=left | Disc.: CSS || 
|- id="2003 WD171" bgcolor=#d6d6d6
| – ||  || MBA-O || 16.8 || 2.4 km || single || 24 days || 15 Dec 2003 || 10 || align=left | Disc.: NEAT || 
|- id="2003 WH172" bgcolor=#FA8072
| 0 ||  || MCA || 18.62 || data-sort-value="0.56" | 560 m || multiple || 1999–2019 || 10 Jan 2019 || 130 || align=left | Disc.: LINEARAlt.: 2014 QR17 || 
|- id="2003 WX172" bgcolor=#E9E9E9
| 3 ||  || MBA-M || 18.4 || 1.2 km || multiple || 2003–2021 || 06 Oct 2021 || 19 || align=left | Disc.: LPL/Spacewatch IIAdded on 30 September 2021Alt.: 2021 QF40 || 
|- id="2003 WZ172" bgcolor=#fefefe
| 1 ||  || MBA-I || 18.48 || data-sort-value="0.60" | 600 m || multiple || 2003–2021 || 30 Jun 2021 || 21 || align=left | Disc.: LPL/Spacewatch IIAdded on 17 January 2021 || 
|- id="2003 WD173" bgcolor=#d6d6d6
| 0 ||  || MBA-O || 17.2 || 2.0 km || multiple || 2003–2019 || 01 Nov 2019 || 60 || align=left | Disc.: LPL/Spacewatch II || 
|- id="2003 WE173" bgcolor=#d6d6d6
| 0 ||  || MBA-O || 17.3 || 1.9 km || multiple || 2002–2020 || 18 Apr 2020 || 52 || align=left | Disc.: LPL/Spacewatch II || 
|- id="2003 WS173" bgcolor=#FA8072
| 1 ||  || MCA || 19.1 || data-sort-value="0.45" | 450 m || multiple || 2003–2011 || 25 Jul 2011 || 22 || align=left | Disc.: Spacewatch || 
|- id="2003 WW173" bgcolor=#fefefe
| 0 ||  || MBA-I || 19.3 || data-sort-value="0.41" | 410 m || multiple || 2003–2019 || 27 Oct 2019 || 38 || align=left | Disc.: LPL/Spacewatch II || 
|- id="2003 WG174" bgcolor=#fefefe
| 0 ||  || MBA-I || 18.1 || data-sort-value="0.71" | 710 m || multiple || 2003–2020 || 25 May 2020 || 68 || align=left | Disc.: Spacewatch || 
|- id="2003 WH174" bgcolor=#fefefe
| 0 ||  || MBA-I || 18.28 || data-sort-value="0.66" | 660 m || multiple || 2003–2021 || 27 Nov 2021 || 93 || align=left | Disc.: SpacewatchAlt.: 2014 UQ85 || 
|- id="2003 WN174" bgcolor=#E9E9E9
| 0 ||  || MBA-M || 18.2 || data-sort-value="0.96" | 960 m || multiple || 2001–2020 || 17 Dec 2020 || 65 || align=left | Disc.: SpacewatchAdded on 17 January 2021Alt.: 2020 QD45 || 
|- id="2003 WV174" bgcolor=#d6d6d6
| 2 ||  || MBA-O || 17.2 || 2.0 km || multiple || 2003–2021 || 05 Jan 2021 || 35 || align=left | Disc.: LPL/Spacewatch IIAdded on 17 January 2021 || 
|- id="2003 WA175" bgcolor=#E9E9E9
| 0 ||  || MBA-M || 17.9 || 1.1 km || multiple || 2003–2020 || 07 Dec 2020 || 69 || align=left | Disc.: LPL/Spacewatch II || 
|- id="2003 WL175" bgcolor=#d6d6d6
| 0 ||  || MBA-O || 16.8 || 2.4 km || multiple || 1998–2020 || 21 Apr 2020 || 86 || align=left | Disc.: SpacewatchAlt.: 2017 QM60 || 
|- id="2003 WS175" bgcolor=#fefefe
| 1 ||  || MBA-I || 18.4 || data-sort-value="0.62" | 620 m || multiple || 2003–2021 || 16 Jan 2021 || 99 || align=left | Disc.: SpacewatchAlt.: 2008 EP51 || 
|- id="2003 WJ176" bgcolor=#fefefe
| 1 ||  || MBA-I || 19.2 || data-sort-value="0.43" | 430 m || multiple || 2003–2020 || 16 Oct 2020 || 31 || align=left | Disc.: SpacewatchAdded on 11 May 2021Alt.: 2020 QC79 || 
|- id="2003 WP176" bgcolor=#d6d6d6
| 0 ||  || MBA-O || 16.6 || 2.7 km || multiple || 2003–2021 || 17 Jan 2021 || 91 || align=left | Disc.: LONEOSAlt.: 2014 YQ26 || 
|- id="2003 WY176" bgcolor=#E9E9E9
| 1 ||  || MBA-M || 17.8 || data-sort-value="0.82" | 820 m || multiple || 2003–2019 || 27 Oct 2019 || 71 || align=left | Disc.: Kitt Peak Obs. || 
|- id="2003 WZ176" bgcolor=#fefefe
| 0 ||  || MBA-I || 18.3 || data-sort-value="0.65" | 650 m || multiple || 2003–2018 || 15 Oct 2018 || 61 || align=left | Disc.: Kitt Peak Obs. || 
|- id="2003 WE177" bgcolor=#fefefe
| 0 ||  || MBA-I || 18.39 || data-sort-value="0.62" | 620 m || multiple || 2003–2021 || 26 Nov 2021 || 56 || align=left | Disc.: Kitt Peak Obs.Alt.: 2016 GZ216 || 
|- id="2003 WG177" bgcolor=#fefefe
| 0 ||  || MBA-I || 18.99 || data-sort-value="0.47" | 470 m || multiple || 2003–2021 || 24 Nov 2021 || 65 || align=left | Disc.: Kitt Peak Obs. || 
|- id="2003 WQ177" bgcolor=#fefefe
| 1 ||  || MBA-I || 19.0 || data-sort-value="0.47" | 470 m || multiple || 2003–2016 || 14 Apr 2016 || 22 || align=left | Disc.: Kitt Peak Obs. || 
|- id="2003 WD178" bgcolor=#E9E9E9
| 2 ||  || MBA-M || 17.7 || data-sort-value="0.86" | 860 m || multiple || 1999–2019 || 27 Oct 2019 || 58 || align=left | Disc.: Kitt Peak Obs. || 
|- id="2003 WM178" bgcolor=#E9E9E9
| 0 ||  || MBA-M || 17.8 || 1.2 km || multiple || 2003–2020 || 05 Nov 2020 || 89 || align=left | Disc.: Kitt Peak Obs.Added on 17 January 2021 || 
|- id="2003 WT178" bgcolor=#E9E9E9
| 0 ||  || MBA-M || 17.64 || data-sort-value="0.88" | 880 m || multiple || 2003–2022 || 10 Jan 2022 || 59 || align=left | Disc.: Kitt Peak Obs.Alt.: 2015 PO213 || 
|- id="2003 WU178" bgcolor=#fefefe
| E ||  || MBA-I || 18.5 || data-sort-value="0.59" | 590 m || single || 4 days || 24 Nov 2003 || 6 || align=left | Disc.: Kitt Peak Obs. || 
|- id="2003 WV178" bgcolor=#fefefe
| 0 ||  || MBA-I || 19.8 || data-sort-value="0.33" | 330 m || multiple || 2003–2018 || 02 Nov 2018 || 26 || align=left | Disc.: Kitt Peak Obs.Added on 24 December 2021 || 
|- id="2003 WX178" bgcolor=#d6d6d6
| – ||  || MBA-O || 19.5 || data-sort-value="0.70" | 700 m || single || 4 days || 24 Nov 2003 || 6 || align=left | Disc.: Kitt Peak Obs. || 
|- id="2003 WB179" bgcolor=#d6d6d6
| 3 ||  || MBA-O || 17.9 || 1.5 km || multiple || 2003–2019 || 24 Oct 2019 || 27 || align=left | Disc.: Kitt Peak Obs.Added on 9 March 2021Alt.: 2019 SN68 || 
|- id="2003 WG179" bgcolor=#E9E9E9
| 0 ||  || MBA-M || 18.2 || data-sort-value="0.96" | 960 m || multiple || 2003–2020 || 05 Nov 2020 || 51 || align=left | Disc.: Kitt Peak Obs.Added on 17 January 2021Alt.: 2011 OU45 || 
|- id="2003 WJ179" bgcolor=#fefefe
| 0 ||  || MBA-I || 18.93 || data-sort-value="0.49" | 490 m || multiple || 2003–2021 || 30 Jun 2021 || 48 || align=left | Disc.: Kitt Peak Obs. || 
|- id="2003 WN179" bgcolor=#d6d6d6
| 0 ||  || MBA-O || 17.0 || 2.2 km || multiple || 2003–2020 || 16 Nov 2020 || 60 || align=left | Disc.: LPL/Spacewatch IIAlt.: 2016 EJ3 || 
|- id="2003 WO179" bgcolor=#E9E9E9
| 1 ||  || MBA-M || 18.3 || data-sort-value="0.92" | 920 m || multiple || 2003–2020 || 17 Sep 2020 || 25 || align=left | Disc.: LPL/Spacewatch II || 
|- id="2003 WW179" bgcolor=#d6d6d6
| 0 ||  || MBA-O || 16.9 || 2.3 km || multiple || 2003–2021 || 17 Jan 2021 || 66 || align=left | Disc.: Kitt Peak Obs. || 
|- id="2003 WJ180" bgcolor=#d6d6d6
| 0 ||  || MBA-O || 17.2 || 2.0 km || multiple || 2003–2021 || 04 Jan 2021 || 46 || align=left | Disc.: Kitt Peak Obs. || 
|- id="2003 WQ180" bgcolor=#d6d6d6
| 0 ||  || MBA-O || 17.3 || 1.9 km || multiple || 2000–2018 || 06 Oct 2018 || 51 || align=left | Disc.: Kitt Peak Obs. || 
|- id="2003 WU180" bgcolor=#fefefe
| 1 ||  || MBA-I || 19.30 || data-sort-value="0.41" | 410 m || multiple || 2003–2020 || 23 Aug 2020 || 24 || align=left | Disc.: Kitt Peak Obs.Added on 17 January 2021 || 
|- id="2003 WW180" bgcolor=#d6d6d6
| 0 ||  || MBA-O || 16.2 || 3.2 km || multiple || 2003–2021 || 17 Jan 2021 || 219 || align=left | Disc.: Kitt Peak Obs.Alt.: 2010 GT36 || 
|- id="2003 WY180" bgcolor=#fefefe
| 0 ||  || MBA-I || 18.6 || data-sort-value="0.57" | 570 m || multiple || 2003–2017 || 15 Sep 2017 || 55 || align=left | Disc.: Kitt Peak Obs.Alt.: 2016 GQ227 || 
|- id="2003 WZ180" bgcolor=#fefefe
| 0 ||  || MBA-I || 18.29 || data-sort-value="0.65" | 650 m || multiple || 2003–2021 || 01 Jul 2021 || 68 || align=left | Disc.: Kitt Peak Obs.Added on 22 July 2020 || 
|- id="2003 WE181" bgcolor=#C2FFFF
| 0 ||  || JT || 14.06 || 8.6 km || multiple || 2003–2021 || 30 Jun 2021 || 170 || align=left | Disc.: Kitt Peak Obs.Trojan camp (L5) || 
|- id="2003 WK181" bgcolor=#E9E9E9
| 1 ||  || MBA-M || 18.32 || data-sort-value="0.91" | 910 m || multiple || 2003–2020 || 10 Nov 2020 || 63 || align=left | Disc.: Kitt Peak Obs.Added on 17 January 2021 || 
|- id="2003 WD182" bgcolor=#FA8072
| – ||  || MCA || 19.9 || data-sort-value="0.31" | 310 m || single || 2 days || 24 Nov 2003 || 6 || align=left | Disc.: Kitt Peak Obs. || 
|- id="2003 WM182" bgcolor=#d6d6d6
| 0 ||  || MBA-O || 17.5 || 1.8 km || multiple || 2003–2021 || 09 May 2021 || 46 || align=left | Disc.: Kitt Peak Obs.Added on 21 August 2021Alt.: 2015 BB392 || 
|- id="2003 WP182" bgcolor=#d6d6d6
| 0 ||  || MBA-O || 17.05 || 2.2 km || multiple || 2003–2019 || 22 Sep 2019 || 37 || align=left | Disc.: Kitt Peak Obs.Added on 21 August 2021Alt.: 2014 WK599 || 
|- id="2003 WQ182" bgcolor=#d6d6d6
| 2 ||  || MBA-O || 17.8 || 1.5 km || multiple || 2003–2020 || 26 Jan 2020 || 31 || align=left | Disc.: Kitt Peak Obs. || 
|- id="2003 WD183" bgcolor=#E9E9E9
| 0 ||  || MBA-M || 16.71 || 2.5 km || multiple || 2003–2021 || 27 Nov 2021 || 137 || align=left | Disc.: Kitt Peak Obs. || 
|- id="2003 WJ183" bgcolor=#d6d6d6
| 0 ||  || MBA-O || 17.0 || 2.2 km || multiple || 2003–2019 || 24 Dec 2019 || 46 || align=left | Disc.: Kitt Peak Obs. || 
|- id="2003 WW183" bgcolor=#fefefe
| 0 ||  || MBA-I || 18.89 || data-sort-value="0.50" | 500 m || multiple || 2002–2021 || 12 May 2021 || 64 || align=left | Disc.: Kitt Peak Obs.Added on 11 May 2021Alt.: 2006 UP252, 2021 GY52 || 
|- id="2003 WZ183" bgcolor=#fefefe
| 0 ||  || HUN || 19.48 || data-sort-value="0.38" | 380 m || multiple || 2003–2021 || 31 May 2021 || 39 || align=left | Disc.: Kitt Peak Obs. || 
|- id="2003 WK184" bgcolor=#fefefe
| 0 ||  || MBA-I || 18.39 || data-sort-value="0.62" | 620 m || multiple || 2003–2021 || 07 Nov 2021 || 58 || align=left | Disc.: Kitt Peak Obs.Added on 22 July 2020Alt.: 2020 JS4 || 
|- id="2003 WS184" bgcolor=#C2E0FF
| E ||  || TNO || 7.4 || 114 km || single || 4 days || 24 Nov 2003 || 4 || align=left | Disc.: Kitt Peak Obs.LoUTNOs, cubewano? || 
|- id="2003 WT184" bgcolor=#fefefe
| – ||  || MBA-I || 19.1 || data-sort-value="0.45" | 450 m || single || 31 days || 21 Dec 2003 || 7 || align=left | Disc.: Kitt Peak Obs. || 
|- id="2003 WW184" bgcolor=#fefefe
| 0 ||  || MBA-I || 17.92 || data-sort-value="0.77" | 770 m || multiple || 2003–2021 || 14 Apr 2021 || 126 || align=left | Disc.: SpacewatchAlt.: 2009 RU27, 2015 OT35 || 
|- id="2003 WC185" bgcolor=#fefefe
| 0 ||  || MBA-I || 19.43 || data-sort-value="0.39" | 390 m || multiple || 2003–2021 || 09 Dec 2021 || 46 || align=left | Disc.: Kitt Peak Obs.Alt.: 2006 OE31 || 
|- id="2003 WD185" bgcolor=#d6d6d6
| 0 ||  || MBA-O || 17.2 || 2.0 km || multiple || 2002–2021 || 16 Jan 2021 || 37 || align=left | Disc.: Kitt Peak Obs. || 
|- id="2003 WJ185" bgcolor=#fefefe
| 0 ||  || MBA-I || 19.14 || data-sort-value="0.44" | 440 m || multiple || 2003–2021 || 30 Nov 2021 || 56 || align=left | Disc.: Kitt Peak Obs. || 
|- id="2003 WQ185" bgcolor=#d6d6d6
| 2 ||  || MBA-O || 17.3 || 1.9 km || multiple || 2003–2019 || 28 Dec 2019 || 42 || align=left | Disc.: Kitt Peak Obs. || 
|- id="2003 WR185" bgcolor=#E9E9E9
| 0 ||  || MBA-M || 18.3 || data-sort-value="0.65" | 650 m || multiple || 2003–2021 || 12 Feb 2021 || 35 || align=left | Disc.: Kitt Peak Obs.Added on 11 May 2021Alt.: 2021 BT4 || 
|- id="2003 WU185" bgcolor=#E9E9E9
| 0 ||  || MBA-M || 18.2 || data-sort-value="0.68" | 680 m || multiple || 2003–2021 || 23 Jan 2021 || 66 || align=left | Disc.: SpacewatchAlt.: 2013 EE107, 2017 DF121 || 
|- id="2003 WY185" bgcolor=#E9E9E9
| 0 ||  || MBA-M || 18.61 || data-sort-value="0.56" | 560 m || multiple || 1999–2020 || 12 Dec 2020 || 45 || align=left | Disc.: SpacewatchAdded on 21 August 2021Alt.: 1999 VQ231 || 
|- id="2003 WE186" bgcolor=#E9E9E9
| 0 ||  || MBA-M || 17.80 || 1.5 km || multiple || 2003–2021 || 31 Oct 2021 || 33 || align=left | Disc.: Kitt Peak Obs.Added on 22 July 2020 || 
|- id="2003 WJ186" bgcolor=#d6d6d6
| 0 ||  || MBA-O || 17.4 || 1.8 km || multiple || 2003–2020 || 22 Mar 2020 || 47 || align=left | Disc.: Kitt Peak Obs.Alt.: 2015 BA429 || 
|- id="2003 WR186" bgcolor=#fefefe
| 0 ||  || MBA-I || 17.6 || data-sort-value="0.90" | 900 m || multiple || 2003–2020 || 06 Dec 2020 || 193 || align=left | Disc.: Kitt Peak Obs. || 
|- id="2003 WS186" bgcolor=#E9E9E9
| 1 ||  || MBA-M || 18.3 || data-sort-value="0.92" | 920 m || multiple || 2003–2020 || 15 Sep 2020 || 45 || align=left | Disc.: Kitt Peak Obs.Added on 19 October 2020 || 
|- id="2003 WT186" bgcolor=#E9E9E9
| 0 ||  || MBA-M || 17.94 || 1.4 km || multiple || 2003–2021 || 26 Oct 2021 || 68 || align=left | Disc.: Kitt Peak Obs. || 
|- id="2003 WU186" bgcolor=#E9E9E9
| 3 ||  || MBA-M || 18.9 || data-sort-value="0.70" | 700 m || multiple || 2003–2020 || 11 Nov 2020 || 27 || align=left | Disc.: Kitt Peak Obs.Added on 17 January 2021 || 
|- id="2003 WX186" bgcolor=#fefefe
| 0 ||  || MBA-I || 18.1 || data-sort-value="0.71" | 710 m || multiple || 2003–2021 || 16 Jan 2021 || 82 || align=left | Disc.: Kitt Peak Obs. || 
|- id="2003 WD187" bgcolor=#d6d6d6
| 1 ||  || MBA-O || 17.4 || 1.8 km || multiple || 2003–2019 || 02 Nov 2019 || 43 || align=left | Disc.: Kitt Peak Obs.Added on 9 March 2021Alt.: 2019 SY24 || 
|- id="2003 WE187" bgcolor=#fefefe
| 1 ||  || HUN || 19.3 || data-sort-value="0.41" | 410 m || multiple || 2003–2016 || 07 May 2016 || 27 || align=left | Disc.: Kitt Peak Obs.Alt.: 2014 WW157 || 
|- id="2003 WF187" bgcolor=#d6d6d6
| 0 ||  || MBA-O || 16.98 || 2.2 km || multiple || 2000–2022 || 27 Jan 2022 || 73 || align=left | Disc.: Kitt Peak Obs.Alt.: 2011 BP146, 2012 GL18 || 
|- id="2003 WH187" bgcolor=#d6d6d6
| 0 ||  || MBA-O || 16.9 || 2.3 km || multiple || 2003–2019 || 28 Nov 2019 || 57 || align=left | Disc.: Kitt Peak Obs.Alt.: 2016 EX191 || 
|- id="2003 WM187" bgcolor=#E9E9E9
| 0 ||  || MBA-M || 18.9 || data-sort-value="0.70" | 700 m || multiple || 2003–2020 || 14 Dec 2020 || 45 || align=left | Disc.: Kitt Peak Obs.Added on 17 January 2021 || 
|- id="2003 WS187" bgcolor=#E9E9E9
| 3 ||  || MBA-M || 18.8 || data-sort-value="0.52" | 520 m || multiple || 2003–2019 || 28 Aug 2019 || 43 || align=left | Disc.: Kitt Peak Obs. || 
|- id="2003 WW187" bgcolor=#d6d6d6
| 2 ||  || MBA-O || 17.9 || 1.5 km || multiple || 2003–2019 || 29 Oct 2019 || 28 || align=left | Disc.: Kitt Peak Obs.Added on 22 July 2020 || 
|- id="2003 WE188" bgcolor=#fefefe
| 1 ||  || MBA-I || 19.2 || data-sort-value="0.43" | 430 m || multiple || 2002–2018 || 19 Mar 2018 || 19 || align=left | Disc.: Kitt Peak Obs. || 
|- id="2003 WF188" bgcolor=#d6d6d6
| 0 ||  || MBA-O || 17.5 || 1.8 km || multiple || 2003–2019 || 27 Oct 2019 || 26 || align=left | Disc.: Kitt Peak Obs.Alt.: 2013 QA20 || 
|- id="2003 WG188" bgcolor=#E9E9E9
| 1 ||  || MBA-M || 18.50 || data-sort-value="0.59" | 590 m || multiple || 1995–2021 || 03 Apr 2021 || 56 || align=left | Disc.: Kitt Peak Obs. || 
|- id="2003 WJ188" bgcolor=#E9E9E9
| 0 ||  || MBA-M || 17.9 || data-sort-value="0.78" | 780 m || multiple || 2003–2021 || 14 Jan 2021 || 61 || align=left | Disc.: Kitt Peak Obs. || 
|- id="2003 WN188" bgcolor=#C7FF8F
| 1 ||  || CEN || 14.0 || 10 km || multiple || 2003–2005 || 04 Jul 2005 || 205 || align=left | Disc.: CSS, albedo: 0.050; BR-mag: 1.26 || 
|- id="2003 WQ188" bgcolor=#C2E0FF
| E ||  || TNO || 5.9 || 227 km || single || 99 days || 27 Feb 2004 || 5 || align=left | Disc.: Kitt Peak Obs.LoUTNOs, cubewano? || 
|- id="2003 WS188" bgcolor=#C2E0FF
| E ||  || TNO || 9.0 || 75 km || single || 1 day || 21 Nov 2003 || 3 || align=left | Disc.: Kitt Peak Obs.LoUTNOs, plutino? || 
|- id="2003 WU188" bgcolor=#C2E0FF
| 3 ||  || TNO || 6.37 || 178 km || multiple || 2003–2020 || 09 Dec 2020 || 56 || align=left | Disc.: Kitt Peak Obs.LoUTNOs, cubewano (cold), albedo: 0.150; binary: 129 km || 
|- id="2003 WV188" bgcolor=#C2E0FF
| E ||  || TNO || 7.1 || 130 km || single || 4 days || 24 Nov 2003 || 3 || align=left | Disc.: Kitt Peak Obs.LoUTNOs, cubewano? || 
|- id="2003 WW188" bgcolor=#C2E0FF
| E ||  || TNO || 7.4 || 114 km || single || 3 days || 24 Nov 2003 || 3 || align=left | Disc.: Kitt Peak Obs.LoUTNOs, cubewano? || 
|- id="2003 WA191" bgcolor=#C2E0FF
| 3 ||  || TNO || 8.29 || 104 km || multiple || 2003–2020 || 09 Dec 2020 || 25 || align=left | Disc.: Kitt Peak Obs.LoUTNOs, plutino || 
|- id="2003 WT191" bgcolor=#E9E9E9
| 0 ||  || MBA-M || 17.48 || 1.8 km || multiple || 2003–2021 || 30 Nov 2021 || 102 || align=left | Disc.: Spacewatch || 
|- id="2003 WN193" bgcolor=#C2E0FF
| – ||  || TNO || 8.5 || 94 km || single || 42 days || 29 Dec 2003 || 12 || align=left | Disc.: Cerro TololoLoUTNOs, plutino || 
|- id="2003 WO193" bgcolor=#C2E0FF
| 2 ||  || TNO || 8.2 || 108 km || multiple || 2003–2017 || 01 Jan 2017 || 29 || align=left | Disc.: Cerro TololoLoUTNOs, plutino || 
|- id="2003 WZ193" bgcolor=#E9E9E9
| 1 ||  || MBA-M || 18.0 || 1.1 km || multiple || 2003–2021 || 06 Jan 2021 || 74 || align=left | Disc.: Spacewatch || 
|- id="2003 WJ194" bgcolor=#fefefe
| 0 ||  || MBA-I || 18.4 || data-sort-value="0.62" | 620 m || multiple || 2003–2020 || 16 Nov 2020 || 71 || align=left | Disc.: SpacewatchAlt.: 2010 XL75 || 
|- id="2003 WM194" bgcolor=#fefefe
| 0 ||  || MBA-I || 18.36 || data-sort-value="0.63" | 630 m || multiple || 2003–2021 || 28 Dec 2021 || 47 || align=left | Disc.: SDSS || 
|- id="2003 WV194" bgcolor=#E9E9E9
| 0 ||  || MBA-M || 17.62 || 1.3 km || multiple || 2003–2022 || 27 Jan 2022 || 90 || align=left | Disc.: SDSS || 
|- id="2003 WH195" bgcolor=#d6d6d6
| 0 ||  || MBA-O || 17.2 || 2.0 km || multiple || 2003–2021 || 04 Jan 2021 || 42 || align=left | Disc.: Kitt Peak Obs.Added on 24 August 2020Alt.: 2019 UB33 || 
|- id="2003 WN195" bgcolor=#fefefe
| 0 ||  || MBA-I || 18.61 || data-sort-value="0.56" | 560 m || multiple || 2003–2021 || 27 Nov 2021 || 105 || align=left | Disc.: SDSS || 
|- id="2003 WQ195" bgcolor=#E9E9E9
| 0 ||  || MBA-M || 17.5 || 1.3 km || multiple || 2003–2020 || 08 Dec 2020 || 79 || align=left | Disc.: LINEARAdded on 17 January 2021 || 
|- id="2003 WV195" bgcolor=#fefefe
| 0 ||  || HUN || 18.8 || data-sort-value="0.52" | 520 m || multiple || 2003–2019 || 29 Jun 2019 || 45 || align=left | Disc.: LONEOS || 
|- id="2003 WX195" bgcolor=#fefefe
| 0 ||  || MBA-I || 17.9 || data-sort-value="0.78" | 780 m || multiple || 1997–2020 || 25 Mar 2020 || 50 || align=left | Disc.: SDSSAdded on 22 July 2020Alt.: 2014 QR97 || 
|- id="2003 WZ195" bgcolor=#fefefe
| 0 ||  || MBA-I || 17.5 || data-sort-value="0.94" | 940 m || multiple || 2003–2021 || 16 Jan 2021 || 180 || align=left | Disc.: Spacewatch || 
|- id="2003 WB196" bgcolor=#fefefe
| 0 ||  || MBA-I || 18.19 || data-sort-value="0.68" | 680 m || multiple || 2003–2022 || 09 Jan 2022 || 120 || align=left | Disc.: CINEOS || 
|- id="2003 WC196" bgcolor=#E9E9E9
| 0 ||  || MBA-M || 17.26 || 2.0 km || multiple || 2003–2021 || 04 Oct 2021 || 119 || align=left | Disc.: Spacewatch || 
|- id="2003 WD196" bgcolor=#fefefe
| 0 ||  || MBA-I || 17.9 || data-sort-value="0.78" | 780 m || multiple || 2003–2021 || 01 Feb 2021 || 123 || align=left | Disc.: Spacewatch || 
|- id="2003 WE196" bgcolor=#fefefe
| 0 ||  || MBA-I || 17.69 || data-sort-value="0.86" | 860 m || multiple || 2003–2021 || 09 Dec 2021 || 200 || align=left | Disc.: Spacewatch || 
|- id="2003 WM196" bgcolor=#E9E9E9
| 0 ||  || MBA-M || 17.11 || 2.1 km || multiple || 2003–2021 || 27 Sep 2021 || 154 || align=left | Disc.: Spacewatch || 
|- id="2003 WN196" bgcolor=#C2FFFF
| 0 ||  || JT || 13.2 || 13 km || multiple || 2003–2021 || 11 Jun 2021 || 138 || align=left | Disc.: Kitt Peak Obs.Trojan camp (L5)Alt.: 2010 GU71 || 
|- id="2003 WR196" bgcolor=#fefefe
| 0 ||  || MBA-I || 18.1 || data-sort-value="0.71" | 710 m || multiple || 2003–2020 || 20 Oct 2020 || 96 || align=left | Disc.: Spacewatch || 
|- id="2003 WZ196" bgcolor=#d6d6d6
| 0 ||  || MBA-O || 16.07 || 3.4 km || multiple || 2003–2021 || 04 Oct 2021 || 103 || align=left | Disc.: Kitt Peak Obs. || 
|- id="2003 WD197" bgcolor=#fefefe
| 0 ||  || MBA-I || 18.4 || data-sort-value="0.62" | 620 m || multiple || 2003–2020 || 20 Oct 2020 || 95 || align=left | Disc.: Spacewatch || 
|- id="2003 WE197" bgcolor=#fefefe
| 0 ||  || MBA-I || 18.2 || data-sort-value="0.68" | 680 m || multiple || 2003–2019 || 23 Sep 2019 || 92 || align=left | Disc.: Spacewatch || 
|- id="2003 WF197" bgcolor=#fefefe
| 0 ||  || MBA-I || 18.08 || data-sort-value="0.72" | 720 m || multiple || 2003–2022 || 27 Jan 2022 || 100 || align=left | Disc.: Spacewatch || 
|- id="2003 WG197" bgcolor=#E9E9E9
| 0 ||  || MBA-M || 16.9 || 1.8 km || multiple || 2003–2021 || 05 Jan 2021 || 143 || align=left | Disc.: Spacewatch || 
|- id="2003 WH197" bgcolor=#fefefe
| 0 ||  || MBA-I || 18.1 || data-sort-value="0.71" | 710 m || multiple || 2003–2020 || 11 Dec 2020 || 112 || align=left | Disc.: Kitt Peak Obs. || 
|- id="2003 WJ197" bgcolor=#d6d6d6
| 0 ||  || MBA-O || 16.9 || 2.3 km || multiple || 2003–2020 || 20 Apr 2020 || 75 || align=left | Disc.: Spacewatch || 
|- id="2003 WN197" bgcolor=#fefefe
| 0 ||  || HUN || 18.7 || data-sort-value="0.54" | 540 m || multiple || 2003–2021 || 08 Jan 2021 || 86 || align=left | Disc.: Spacewatch || 
|- id="2003 WO197" bgcolor=#E9E9E9
| 0 ||  || MBA-M || 17.59 || 1.7 km || multiple || 2003–2021 || 10 Sep 2021 || 69 || align=left | Disc.: Kitt Peak Obs. || 
|- id="2003 WQ197" bgcolor=#E9E9E9
| 0 ||  || MBA-M || 17.2 || 2.0 km || multiple || 2003–2019 || 11 Apr 2019 || 64 || align=left | Disc.: Tenagra II Obs. || 
|- id="2003 WS197" bgcolor=#C2FFFF
| 0 ||  || JT || 14.6 || 6.7 km || multiple || 2003–2020 || 15 May 2020 || 78 || align=left | Disc.: Kitt Peak Obs.Trojan camp (L5) || 
|- id="2003 WU197" bgcolor=#fefefe
| 0 ||  || MBA-I || 18.3 || data-sort-value="0.65" | 650 m || multiple || 2003–2020 || 10 Dec 2020 || 89 || align=left | Disc.: Kitt Peak Obs. || 
|- id="2003 WV197" bgcolor=#fefefe
| 0 ||  || MBA-I || 17.81 || data-sort-value="0.81" | 810 m || multiple || 1995–2021 || 03 Aug 2021 || 102 || align=left | Disc.: SpacewatchAlt.: 2016 BM28 || 
|- id="2003 WX197" bgcolor=#E9E9E9
| 0 ||  || MBA-M || 17.0 || 1.7 km || multiple || 2003–2021 || 12 Jan 2021 || 152 || align=left | Disc.: Spacewatch || 
|- id="2003 WY197" bgcolor=#E9E9E9
| 0 ||  || MBA-M || 17.0 || 1.7 km || multiple || 2003–2020 || 20 Dec 2020 || 134 || align=left | Disc.: Spacewatch || 
|- id="2003 WA198" bgcolor=#fefefe
| 0 ||  || MBA-I || 18.4 || data-sort-value="0.62" | 620 m || multiple || 2003–2021 || 11 Jan 2021 || 90 || align=left | Disc.: Spacewatch || 
|- id="2003 WB198" bgcolor=#fefefe
| 0 ||  || MBA-I || 18.5 || data-sort-value="0.59" | 590 m || multiple || 2003–2021 || 18 Jan 2021 || 96 || align=left | Disc.: Spacewatch || 
|- id="2003 WC198" bgcolor=#d6d6d6
| 0 ||  || MBA-O || 16.2 || 3.2 km || multiple || 2003–2021 || 17 Jan 2021 || 100 || align=left | Disc.: Spacewatch || 
|- id="2003 WE198" bgcolor=#E9E9E9
| 0 ||  || MBA-M || 17.90 || data-sort-value="0.78" | 780 m || multiple || 2003–2021 || 09 Apr 2021 || 99 || align=left | Disc.: Spacewatch || 
|- id="2003 WG198" bgcolor=#E9E9E9
| 0 ||  || MBA-M || 16.77 || 2.5 km || multiple || 2003–2021 || 08 Dec 2021 || 137 || align=left | Disc.: Spacewatch || 
|- id="2003 WH198" bgcolor=#E9E9E9
| 0 ||  || MBA-M || 17.2 || 1.1 km || multiple || 1993–2021 || 13 Jan 2021 || 105 || align=left | Disc.: Spacewatch || 
|- id="2003 WJ198" bgcolor=#fefefe
| 0 ||  || MBA-I || 18.0 || data-sort-value="0.75" | 750 m || multiple || 2003–2021 || 09 Jan 2021 || 96 || align=left | Disc.: Spacewatch || 
|- id="2003 WL198" bgcolor=#d6d6d6
| 0 ||  || MBA-O || 16.1 || 3.4 km || multiple || 2002–2021 || 11 Jan 2021 || 129 || align=left | Disc.: SDSSAlt.: 2002 UF51 || 
|- id="2003 WN198" bgcolor=#d6d6d6
| 0 ||  || MBA-O || 17.0 || 2.2 km || multiple || 2003–2019 || 24 Dec 2019 || 75 || align=left | Disc.: SDSS || 
|- id="2003 WO198" bgcolor=#E9E9E9
| 0 ||  || MBA-M || 17.4 || 1.4 km || multiple || 2003–2020 || 06 Dec 2020 || 100 || align=left | Disc.: SDSS || 
|- id="2003 WP198" bgcolor=#fefefe
| 0 ||  || MBA-I || 17.8 || data-sort-value="0.82" | 820 m || multiple || 2003–2020 || 05 Nov 2020 || 99 || align=left | Disc.: LPL/Spacewatch II || 
|- id="2003 WQ198" bgcolor=#E9E9E9
| 0 ||  || MBA-M || 17.06 || 2.2 km || multiple || 2003–2021 || 07 Nov 2021 || 123 || align=left | Disc.: Spacewatch || 
|- id="2003 WR198" bgcolor=#E9E9E9
| 0 ||  || MBA-M || 18.00 || data-sort-value="0.75" | 750 m || multiple || 2003–2021 || 08 Apr 2021 || 91 || align=left | Disc.: Kitt Peak Obs. || 
|- id="2003 WS198" bgcolor=#fefefe
| 1 ||  || MBA-I || 17.9 || data-sort-value="0.78" | 780 m || multiple || 2003–2017 || 13 Dec 2017 || 56 || align=left | Disc.: SDSS || 
|- id="2003 WT198" bgcolor=#d6d6d6
| 0 ||  || MBA-O || 16.7 || 2.5 km || multiple || 2003–2020 || 16 Dec 2020 || 80 || align=left | Disc.: Spacewatch || 
|- id="2003 WW198" bgcolor=#fefefe
| 0 ||  || MBA-I || 18.36 || data-sort-value="0.63" | 630 m || multiple || 2003–2021 || 01 Nov 2021 || 54 || align=left | Disc.: Kitt Peak Obs. || 
|- id="2003 WX198" bgcolor=#d6d6d6
| 0 ||  || MBA-O || 17.0 || 2.2 km || multiple || 2003–2021 || 18 Jan 2021 || 78 || align=left | Disc.: LPL/Spacewatch II || 
|- id="2003 WY198" bgcolor=#fefefe
| 0 ||  || MBA-I || 17.40 || data-sort-value="0.98" | 980 m || multiple || 2003–2021 || 08 Nov 2021 || 89 || align=left | Disc.: Spacewatch || 
|- id="2003 WB199" bgcolor=#d6d6d6
| 0 ||  || MBA-O || 17.4 || 1.8 km || multiple || 2003–2020 || 22 Apr 2020 || 56 || align=left | Disc.: Kitt Peak Obs. || 
|- id="2003 WC199" bgcolor=#fefefe
| 0 ||  || MBA-I || 18.1 || data-sort-value="0.71" | 710 m || multiple || 2003–2018 || 06 Oct 2018 || 56 || align=left | Disc.: Spacewatch || 
|- id="2003 WF199" bgcolor=#fefefe
| 0 ||  || MBA-I || 18.2 || data-sort-value="0.68" | 680 m || multiple || 2003–2021 || 06 Jan 2021 || 179 || align=left | Disc.: Spacewatch || 
|- id="2003 WG199" bgcolor=#fefefe
| 0 ||  || MBA-I || 18.1 || data-sort-value="0.71" | 710 m || multiple || 2003–2020 || 17 Dec 2020 || 59 || align=left | Disc.: Spacewatch || 
|- id="2003 WH199" bgcolor=#d6d6d6
| 0 ||  || MBA-O || 16.5 || 2.8 km || multiple || 2003–2021 || 06 Jan 2021 || 91 || align=left | Disc.: SDSSAlt.: 2010 CB209 || 
|- id="2003 WJ199" bgcolor=#d6d6d6
| 0 ||  || MBA-O || 17.52 || 1.7 km || multiple || 2001–2021 || 05 Jul 2021 || 73 || align=left | Disc.: Kitt Peak Obs. || 
|- id="2003 WK199" bgcolor=#d6d6d6
| 0 ||  || MBA-O || 15.9 || 3.7 km || multiple || 2003–2021 || 14 Jan 2021 || 137 || align=left | Disc.: SpacewatchAlt.: 2010 FD71 || 
|- id="2003 WO199" bgcolor=#E9E9E9
| 0 ||  || MBA-M || 17.22 || 1.1 km || multiple || 2003–2021 || 08 Apr 2021 || 116 || align=left | Disc.: SpacewatchAlt.: 2013 ES173 || 
|- id="2003 WQ199" bgcolor=#E9E9E9
| 0 ||  || MBA-M || 17.94 || 1.4 km || multiple || 2003–2021 || 04 Oct 2021 || 63 || align=left | Disc.: Spacewatch || 
|- id="2003 WR199" bgcolor=#d6d6d6
| 0 ||  || MBA-O || 17.1 || 2.1 km || multiple || 2003–2021 || 04 Aug 2021 || 58 || align=left | Disc.: SpacewatchAlt.: 2014 AM33 || 
|- id="2003 WT199" bgcolor=#fefefe
| 0 ||  || MBA-I || 18.92 || data-sort-value="0.49" | 490 m || multiple || 2003–2022 || 26 Jan 2022 || 52 || align=left | Disc.: Spacewatch || 
|- id="2003 WU199" bgcolor=#E9E9E9
| 0 ||  || MBA-M || 17.63 || 1.7 km || multiple || 2003–2021 || 11 Sep 2021 || 90 || align=left | Disc.: Spacewatch || 
|- id="2003 WV199" bgcolor=#E9E9E9
| 0 ||  || MBA-M || 17.26 || 1.0 km || multiple || 2003–2021 || 11 May 2021 || 102 || align=left | Disc.: Spacewatch || 
|- id="2003 WX199" bgcolor=#d6d6d6
| 0 ||  || MBA-O || 16.92 || 2.3 km || multiple || 2003–2022 || 27 Jan 2022 || 82 || align=left | Disc.: Spacewatch || 
|- id="2003 WY199" bgcolor=#fefefe
| 0 ||  || MBA-I || 18.36 || data-sort-value="0.63" | 630 m || multiple || 2003–2022 || 25 Jan 2022 || 92 || align=left | Disc.: Spacewatch || 
|}
back to top

References 
 

Lists of unnumbered minor planets